The 9 New York Code of Rules and Regulations §466.13 is a 2016 New York State Division of Human Rights statewide regulation that prohibits discrimination and harassment in public and private employment, housing, business, credit, and other categories on the basis of gender identity, transgender status, or gender dysphoria. On October 22, 2015, Governor Andrew Cuomo announced at the Empire State Pride Agenda in Sheraton New York Times Square Hotel, New York City, New York, that he will issue regulations prohibiting discrimination and harassment against transgender people. This was first time that any Governor had issued a statewide regulation to prohibit harassment and discrimination on the basis of gender identity, transgender status or gender dysphoria. On January 20, 2016, 9 New York Code of Rules and Regulations §466.13 went into effect in New York.

See also
LGBT rights in New York
New York State Division of Human Rights

References

External links
 9 New York Code of Rules and Regulations (NYCRR) §466.13

2016 in LGBT history
LGBT rights in New York (state)
Transgender law in the United States
New York (state) law